John Sharat Chandra Banerjee (22 June 1873 – ?) was an Anglican assistant bishop in Lahore. He was the second non-European bishop of the Church of India, Burma and Ceylon.

Early life and career
Banerjee was born in Allahabad. He was the son of a Brahmin convert to Christianity from Bengal, Janki Nath Banerjee. He attended St. John's College in Agra and graduated from Allahabad University with a B.A. in 1900. He was ordained a deacon in 1902 and a priest in 1904. Banerjee served as a Church Mission Society missionary in Lucknow from 1902 through 1931. He was made a canon of Lucknow in 1920.

Bishop
On 25 October 1931, Canon Banerjee was consecrated a bishop at the Cathedral Church of the Resurrection, Lahore to serve there as assistant bishop. The consecrators were the Bishop of Calcutta, the Bishop of Lahore and the Bishop of Lucknow. Bishop Banerjee was the second non-European bishop consecrated for the Anglican Communion in British India, after Bishop Azariah. 

Bishop Banerjee visited Australia in 1936 on the occasion of the centennial of Bishop Broughton where he was presented as Metropolitan of India and delivered a series of notable speeches.

A photographic portrait of Bishop Banerjee is in the collection of the National Portrait Gallery, London.

Personal life
Banerjee married in 1902. As of 1945, he had five sons and one daughter.

References 

20th-century Anglican bishops in India
1873 births
People from Lucknow
University of Allahabad alumni
Year of death missing